Geobiology is a field which studies the effects of the Earth's radiation, such as telluric currents and other electromagnetic fields, on biological life. The term is derived from Ancient Greek gē (ge) meaning ‘earth’ and βίος; (bios) meaning ‘life’. Its findings have not been scientifically proven; thus, it is considered a subsection of pseudoscience.

Claims 
Within geobiology, distinct patterns of Earth radiation, mainly Hartmann lines (named after Ernst Hartmann) and Curry lines (after Manfred Curry; also called Wittmann lines after Siegfried Wittmann) are posited on occasion to have a negative effect on health and even the viability of biological life. Other similar patterns, named after practitioners of geobiology, include Peyré lines (after Francois Peyré), Romani waves (after Lucien Romani), and the Benker cube (after Anton Benker).

It is also claimed that groundwater may create radiation caused by the friction of water against mineral deposits, as well as geological faults, due to a claimed difference in the electric charge of the masses on each side of the fault generating radiation. These are claimed by practitioners to have harmful effects in a phenomenon collectively called geopathic stress. A practitioner of geobiology may also seek out radiation derived from human infrastructure, such as those from overhead and underground power lines and telecommunication infrastructure.

Techniques 
Practitioners of geobiology will typically use a dowsing rod, pendulum or their hands to ascertain the location of radiation, and then use this information to make an assessment on its effect on a residential dwelling or workplace and upon localised natural life. Practitioners may also claim be to able to locate and model a building on a basis similar to the theories of Feng shui, Vastu Shastra, or use of Sacred geometry.

Scientific reception 
No solid scientific foundation for these phenomena has been made. A task group of the World Health Organization investigating the effects of extremely low frequency (ELF) electric and magnetic fields on the health of the general public found "no substantive health issues related to ELF electric fields at levels generally encountered by members of the public". The results of techniques used by practitioners of geobiology, such as dowsing or other forms of radiesthesia, have been attributed to the ideomotor phenomenon.

See also 
 List of topics characterised as pseudoscience

References

Further reading 
 Ernst Hartmann, Krankheit als Standortproblem (Sickness as a Location Problem), 1964; modern edition 
 Georges Lakhovsky, La Terre et Nous (The Earth and Us) 1933; modern edition 
 Francois Peyré, Radiations cosmotellurique (Cosmotelluric Radiation), 1947; modern edition 
 Georges Prat, Atlas de la Géobiologie, 2011  
 James Lovelock, Gaia: A New Look at Life on Earth, 1982 modern edition 
 Anne-Marie Delmotte, The Lecher Antenna Adventures and Research in Geobiology and Bio-Energy, 2019 
 Manfred Curry, BIOKLIMATIK. Die Steuerung des gesunden und kranken Organismus durch die Atmosphäre, (Bioclimate; the management of the healthy and sick organism via the atmosphere) 1946
 Blanche Merz, Hauts-lieux Cosmo-telluriques : leurs énergies subtiles méconnues (Cosmo-telluric Hotspots: their unknown subtle energies), 1997; 
 Michèle Burdet, Stumbling Down the Shamanic Path: Mystic Adventures and Misadventures, 2010

External links 
 Startseite (Geobiology followers of Dr Hartmann)
 VRGS – Verband für Radiästhesie und Geobiologie Schweiz (Swiss Geobiology and Radiesthesia organisation)
 Asociación de Estudios Geobiológicos (Spanish Geobiology organisation)

Pseudoscience